Safe parking lots are parking lots in the United States in which homeless people can park their cars and safely sleep at night. Some hire private security guards to make the facility more safe.

See also
 Social services
 Social welfare

References

Housing
Humanitarian aid
Poverty
Right to housing
Social issues
Socioeconomics
Street culture
Private aid programs